The 2010–11 season was the eighth in the history of the Scarlets regional rugby union team. They competed in the Magners League, the LV Cup and the Heineken Cup

Pre-season and friendlies

Magners League

Results

Table

Anglo-Welsh Cup

Fixtures

Table

Heineken Cup

Fixtures

Table

Statistics

References 

2010-11
2010–11 Celtic League by team
2010–11 in Welsh rugby union
2010–11 Heineken Cup by team